Adut Bulgak (born December 20, 1992) is a South Sudanese-Canadian professional basketball player in the Women's National Basketball Association (WNBA). She was drafted in 2016 to the New York Liberty. Bulgak played JUCO ball at Trinity Valley Community College.

Florida State statistics
Source

References

External links
 

1992 births
Living people
Canadian expatriate basketball people in the United States
Canadian women's basketball players
Chicago Sky players
Florida State Seminoles women's basketball players
Kenyan women's basketball players
New York Liberty draft picks
New York Liberty players
Centers (basketball)